In commutative algebra, a branch of mathematics, going up and going down are terms which refer to certain properties of chains of prime ideals in integral extensions.

The phrase going up refers to the case when a chain can be extended by "upward inclusion", while going down refers to the case when a chain can be extended by "downward inclusion".

The major results are the Cohen–Seidenberg theorems, which were proved by Irvin S. Cohen and Abraham Seidenberg. These are known as the going-up and going-down theorems.

Going up and going down 
Let A ⊆ B be an extension of commutative rings.

The going-up and going-down theorems give sufficient conditions for a chain of prime ideals in B, each member of which lies over members of a longer chain of prime ideals in A, to be able to be extended to the length of the chain of prime ideals in A.

Lying over and incomparability

First, we fix some terminology.

In general, a ring extension A ⊆ B of commutative rings is said to satisfy the lying over property if every prime ideal  of A lies under some prime ideal  of B.

Going-up 

The ring extension A ⊆ B is said to satisfy the going-up property if whenever

is a chain of prime ideals of A and

In  it is shown that if an extension A ⊆ B satisfies the going-up property, then it also satisfies the lying-over property.

Going-down 

The ring extension A ⊆ B is said to satisfy the going-down property if whenever

is a chain of prime ideals of A and

There is a generalization of the ring extension case with ring morphisms. Let f : A → B be a (unital) ring homomorphism so that B is a ring extension of f(A). Then f is said to satisfy the going-up property if the going-up property holds for f(A) in B.

Similarly, if B is a ring extension of f(A), then f is said to satisfy the going-down property if the going-down property holds for f(A) in B.

In the case of ordinary ring extensions such as A ⊆ B, the inclusion map is the pertinent map.

Going-up and going-down theorems

The usual statements of going-up and going-down theorems refer to a ring extension A ⊆ B:
(Going up) If B is an integral extension of A, then the extension satisfies the going-up property (and hence the lying over property), and the incomparability property.
(Going down) If B is an integral extension of A, and B is a domain, and A is integrally closed in its field of fractions, then the extension (in addition to going-up, lying-over and incomparability) satisfies the going-down property.

There is another sufficient condition for the going-down property:
 If A ⊆ B is a flat extension of commutative rings, then the going-down property holds.

Proof: Let p1 ⊆ p2 be prime ideals of A and let q2 be a prime ideal of B such that q2 ∩ A = p2. We wish to prove that there is a prime ideal q1 of B contained in q2 such that q1 ∩ A = p1. Since A ⊆ B is a flat extension of rings, it follows that Ap2 ⊆ Bq2 is a flat extension of rings. In fact, Ap2 ⊆ Bq2 is a faithfully flat extension of rings since the inclusion map Ap2 → Bq2 is a local homomorphism. Therefore, the induced map on spectra Spec(Bq2) → Spec(Ap2) is surjective and there exists a prime ideal of Bq2 that contracts to the prime ideal p1Ap2 of Ap2. The contraction of this prime ideal of Bq2 to B is a prime ideal q1 of B contained in q2 that contracts to p1. The proof is complete. Q.E.D.

References

 Atiyah, M. F., and I. G. Macdonald, Introduction to Commutative Algebra, Perseus Books, 1969,  
 Winfried Bruns; Jürgen Herzog, Cohen–Macaulay rings. Cambridge Studies in Advanced Mathematics, 39. Cambridge University Press, Cambridge, 1993. xii+403 pp. 

 Kaplansky, Irving, Commutative rings, Allyn and Bacon, 1970.
 
 

Commutative algebra
Prime ideals
Theorems in ring theory